

About the Delta DM-19 
The Thor-Delta, also known as Delta DM-19 or just Delta was an early American expendable launch system used for 12 orbital launches in the early 1960s. A derivative of the Thor-Able, it was a member of the Thor family of rockets, and the first member of the Delta family.

The first stage was a Thor missile in the DM-19 configuration. The second stage was the Delta, which had been derived from the earlier Able stage. An Altair solid rocket motor was used as a third stage.

The basic design of the original Vanguard upper stages, featuring a pressure-fed nitric acid/UDMH, regeneratively cooled engine, was kept in place, but with an improved AJ10-118 engine. More significantly, the Delta stage featured cold gas attitude control jets allowing it to be stabilized in orbit for restart and more precise burns.

The Thor-Delta was the first rocket to use the combination of a Thor missile and a Delta upper stage. This configuration was reused for many later rockets, and a derivative, the Delta II, remained in service until 2018.

The Thor-Delta launched a number of significant payloads, including the first communications satellite, Echo 1A; the first British satellite, Ariel 1; and the first active direct-relay communications satellite, Telstar 1. All 12 launches occurred from Cape Canaveral Air Force Station Launch Complex 17. The launch of Telstar 1 used pad B, while all other launches were from pad A. All launches were successful except the maiden flight, which failed to place Echo 1 into orbit due to a problem with the second stage.

Launch statistics

Launch outcome

Launchpad

Orbit

Function

Launch history

See also 
 List of Delta 4 launches
 List of Thor and Delta launches
 List of Thor and Delta launches (1960–1969)
 List of Delta IV Heavy launches
 List of Delta IV Medium launches
 Thor-Delta

References 

Lists of Thor launches
Lists of Delta launches
Lists of rocket launches